Wil Haygood (born September 19, 1954, in Columbus, Ohio) is an American journalist and author who is known for his 2008 article "A Butler Well Served by this Election" in The Washington Post about Eugene Allen, which served as the basis for the 2013 movie The Butler. Since then, Haygood has written a book about Allen, The Butler: A Witness to History. While being interviewed on the radio program Conversations with Allan Wolper on WBGO 88.3FM, Haygood revealed that he had tracked down another White House butler. At the last minute, this butler, who had served three presidents, refused to be interviewed; the man's family apparently did not want his story out against the parallel story of the election of President Barack Obama.

Haygood is a fellow of the John Simon Guggenheim Memorial Foundation and a professor at Miami University. Haygood's 2018 book Tigerland: 1968–1969: A City Divided, A Nation Torn Apart, And A Magical Season Of Healing was the runner-up for the 2019 Dayton Literary Peace Prize for Nonfiction. In 2022, Haygood was chosen as the recipient of the Dayton Literary Peace Prize's Ambassador Richard C. Holbrooke Distinguished Achievement Award.

Books
Two on the River, 1986
King of Cats: The Life and Times of Adam Clayton Powell Jr., 1993
The Haygoods of Columbus: A Family Memoir, 1997
In Black and White: The Life of Sammy Davis Jr., 2003
Sweet Thunder: The Life and Times of Sugar Ray Robinson, 2009
The Butler: A Witness to History, 2013
Showdown: Thurgood Marshall and the Supreme Court Nomination that Changed America, 2015 
Tigerland: 1968–1969: A City Divided, A Nation Torn Apart, And A Magical Season Of Healing, 2018. 
Colorization: One Hundred Years of Black Films in a White World, 2021.

References

External links

1954 births
Living people
African-American journalists
Writers from Columbus, Ohio
Journalists from Ohio
Miami University alumni
The Washington Post journalists
American male journalists
American male biographers
20th-century American biographers
20th-century American journalists
20th-century American male writers
21st-century American biographers
21st-century American journalists
21st-century American male writers
20th-century African-American people
21st-century African-American people